The Battle of Mole Lake was a battle fought in 1806 between Sioux and Chippewa warriors. It was fought over wild rice beds located in Forest County, Wisconsin, United States. At the time, the area of the battle was part of the Indiana Territory.

See also
Battle of the Brule
Tragedy of the Siskiwit

Notes

Mole Lake
Mole Lake
Pre-statehood history of Wisconsin
Ojibwe in the United States
Dakota
Mole Lake
1806 in the United States
Forest County, Wisconsin
Indiana Territory